This is a subarticle of Islamic scholars, List of Muslim scholars and List of historians.

The following is a list of Muslim historians writing in the Islamic historiographical tradition, which developed from hadith literature in the time of the first caliphs.  This list is focused on pre-modern historians who wrote before the heavy European influence that occurred from the 19th century onward.

Chronological list

The historians of the formative period
First era: 700-750 (Ibn Zubayr and al-Zuhri's histories no longer exist, but they are referenced in later works).
 Urwah ibn Zubayr (d. 712)
 Aban bin Uthman bin Affan (d. 723)
 Wahb ibn Munabbih (d. 735)
Second era: 750-800
Ibn Shihab al-Zuhri (d.741)
 Ibn Ishaq (d. 761) Sirah Rasul Allah (The Life of the Apostle of God)
 Abi Mikhnaf (d. 774) Maqtal al-Husayn

Third era: 800-860
 Hisham ibn al-Kalbi (d. 819)
 Al-Waqidi (d. 823) Kitab al-Tarikh wa'l-Maghazi (Book of History and Battles).
 Ibn Hisham (d. 835)
 Ibn Sa'd (d. 845)
 Khalifa ibn Khayyat (d. 854)

Fourth era: 860-900
 Ibn Abd al-Hakam (d. 871) Futuh Misr wa'l-Maghrib wa akhbaruha
 Ibn Qutaybah (d. 889) Uyun al-akhbar, Al-Imama wa al-Siyasa
 Al-Dinawari (d. 891) Akbar al-tiwal
 Baladhuri (d. 892)
 Muhammad ibn Jarir al-Tabari (838CE–923CE)  History of the Prophets and Kings

Fifth era: 900-950
 Ya'qubi (d. 900) Tarikh al-Yaqubi
 Ibn Fadlan (d. after 922)
 Ibn A'tham (d. 314/926-27) al-Futuh
 Abū Muhammad al-Hasan al-Hamdānī (d. 945)

The historians of the classical period

Iraq and Iran
 Abu Bakr bin Yahya al-Suli (d. 946)
 Ali al-Masudi (d. 955) The Meadows of Gold
 Sinan ibn Thabit (d. 976)
 al-Saghani (d. 990) one of the earliest historians of science
 Ibn Miskawayh (d. 1030)
 al-Utbi (d. 1036)
 Hilal ibn al-Muhassin al-Sabi' (d. 1056)
 al-Khatib al-Baghdadi (d. 1071) Tarikh Baghdad (a biographical dictionary of major Baghdadi figures)
 Abolfazl Beyhaqi (995–1077) Tarikh-e Mas'oudi (also known as Tarikh-e Beyhaqi).
 Abu'l-Faraj ibn al-Jawzi (d. 1201)
 Yaqut al-Hamawi (1179–1229) author of Mu'jam al-Buldan ("The Dictionary of Countries")
 Ibn al-Athir (1160–1231) al-Kamil fi'l-Tarikh
 Muhammad bin Ali Rawandi (c.1204) Rahat al-sudur, (a history of the Great Seljuq Empire and its break-up into minor beys)
 Zahiriddin Nasr Muhammad Aufi (d. 1242)
 Sibt ibn al-Jawzi (d. 1256)
 Hamdollah Mostowfi (d. 1281)
 Ibn Bibi (d. after 1281)
 Ata-Malik Juvayni (1283)
 Ibn al-Tiqtaqa (d. after 1302)
 Ibn al-Fuwati (d. 1323)
 Wassaf (d. 1323)
 Rashid-al-Din Hamadani (d. 1398) Jami al-Tawarikh
 Sharaf ad-Din Ali Yazdi (d. 1454)
 Mirkhond (d. 1498) Rauzât-us-safâ

Egypt, Palestine and Syria
 Al-Muqaddasi (d.1000)
 Ẓāhir al-Dīn Nīshāpūrī around 1175
 al-Musabbihi (d. 1030), Akhbar Misr
 Ibn al-Qalanisi (d. 1160)
 Ibn Asakir (d. 1176)
 Usamah ibn Munqidh (d. 1188)
 Imad al-Din al-Isfahani (d. 1201)
 Abd al-Latif al-Baghdadi (d. 1231)
 Baha al-Din ibn Shaddad (d. 1235) al-Nawādir al-Sultaniyya wa'l-Maḥāsin al-Yūsufiyya (The Rare and Excellent History of Saladin)
 Sibt ibn al-Jawzi (d. 1256) Mir'at al-zaman (Mirror of the Time)
 Ibn al-Adim (d. 1262)
 Abu Shama (AH 599–665/AD 1203–68) full name Abū Shāma Shihāb al-Dīn al-Maqdisī
 Ibn Khallikan (d. 1282)
 Ibn Abd al-Zahir (d. 1293)
 Abu'l-Fida (d. 1331)
 al-Nuwayri (d. 1332)
 al-Mizzi (d. 1341)
 al-Dhahabi (d. 1348) Tarikh al-Islam al-kabir
 Ibn Kathir (d. 1373) al-Bidaya wa'l-Nihaya (The Beginning and the End)
 Ibn al-Furat (d. 1405)
 al-Maqrizi (d. 1442) al-Suluk li-ma'firat duwwal al-muluk (Mamluk history of Egypt)
 Ibn Hajr al-Asqalani (d. 1449)
 al-Ayni (d. 1451)
 Ibn Taghribirdi (d. 1470) Nujum al-zahira fi muluk Misr wa'l-Qahira (History of Egypt)
 al-Sakhawi (d. 1497)
 al-Suyuti (d. 1505) History of the Caliphs
 Mujir al-Din al-'Ulaymi (d.1522)

al-Andalus and the Maghreb
 Qadi al-Nu'man (d. 974)
 Ibn al-Qūṭiyya (d. 977) Ta'rikh iftitah al-Andalus
 Ibn Faradi (d. 1012)
 Ibn Hazm (d. 1063)
 Yusuf ibn abd al-Barr (d. 1071)
 Ibn Hayyan (d. 1075)
 al-Udri (d. 1085)
 Abū 'Ubayd 'Abd Allāh al-Bakrī (d. 1094)
 Qadi Iyad (d. 1149)
 Mohammed al-Baydhaq (d. 1164)
 Ibn Rushd (d. 1198)
 Abdelwahid al-Marrakushi
 al-Qurtubi (d. 1273)
 Abdelaziz al-Malzuzi (d. 1298)
 Ibn Idhari (d. 1312)
 Ibn Battuta (d. 1369))
 Ibn al-Khatib (d. 1374)
 Ibn Abi Zar (d. ca. 1320) Rawd al-Qirtas
 Ismail ibn al-Ahmar (d. 1406)
 Ibn Khaldun (d. 1406) al-Muqaddimah and al-I'bar

India

 al-Bīrūnī (d. 1048) Kitab fi Tahqiq ma li'l-Hind (Researches on India), The Remaining Signs of Past Centuries
 Minhaj-i-Siraj (d. after 1260)
 Amir Khusro (d. 1325)
 Ziauddin Barani (d. 1357)
 Akbar Shah Khan Najibabadi (1875–1938)
 Hakim Syed Zillur Rahman Medieval Indian medical historian
 Sayyid Shamsullah Qadri (24 November 1885 – 22 October 1953)
 Muhammad Asadullah Al-Ghalib (15 January 1948)

The early modern historians

Turkish: Ottoman Empire
 Aşıkpaşazade (d. 1481)
 Tursun Beg (d. after 1488)
 İdris-i Bitlisi (d. 1520)
 Ibn Kemal (d. 1534)
 Matrakçı Nasuh (d. 1564)
 Hoca Sadeddin Efendi (d. 1599)
 Mustafa Âlî (d. 1600)
 Mustafa Selaniki (d. 1600)
 Katip Çelebi (d. 1647)
 İbrahim Peçevi (d. 1650)
 Evliya Çelebi (d. after 1682)
 Mustafa Naima (1655–1716) Ta'rīkh-i Na'īmā
 Silahdar Findiklili Mehmed Aga (d. 1723)
 Ahmed Resmî Efendi (d. 1783)
 Ahmet Cevdet Pasha (d. 1895)

Arabic: Ottoman Empire and Morocco
 Ibn Iyas (d. after November 1522)
 Ahmed Mohammed al-Maqqari (d. 1632)
 Mohammed al-Ifrani (d. 1747)
 Mohammed al-Qadiri (d. 1773)
 Khalil al-Muradi (d. 1791)
 Abd al-Rahman al-Jabarti (d. 1825) Aja'ib al-athar fi'l-tarajim wa'l-akhbar
 Ahmad ibn Khalid al-Nasiri (d. 1897)

Persian: Safavid Empire and Mughal India
 Muhammad Khwandamir (d. 1534)
 Abu'l-Fazl ibn Mubarak (d. 1602) Akbarnama
 Abd al-Qadir Bada'uni (d. 1615)
 Firishta (d. 1620)
 Iskandar Beg Munshi (d. 1632)
 Nizamuddin Ahmad (d. 1621)
 Inayat Allah Kamboh (d. 1671)
 Muhammad Saleh Kamboh (d. c. 1675)
 Abul Fazl Mamuri (c. 1700)
 Mirza Mehdi Khan Astarabadi (d. c. 1760)

The historians of the modern period
 Mohammad Iqbal (b. 1877)
 Joel Hayward (b. 1964)

See also
List of Islamic studies scholars

Notes

References
 Robinson, Chase F. (2003), Cambridge University Press, . XIV and XV ("Chase F. Robinson" in "Islamic Historiography" has mentioned the chronological list of Islamic historians.)
 Babinger, Franz. Geschichtsschreiber der Osmanen.  Leipzig: O. Harrassowitz, 1927.
 Encyclopaedia of Islam.  Leiden: Brill, 1960-2004.

See also
 :tr:Osmanlı tarihçileri

Lists of Muslims
Islam-related lists